Michael Clements Maynard (born 7 January 1947) is a former Guyanese footballer who played as a full-back.

Career
In March 1966, Maynard signed for Crystal Palace from Hounslow Town. After failing to make an appearance at Crystal Palace, Maynard joined Peterborough United in July 1967. During his only season at Peterborough, Maynard made three Football League appearances for the club. Following his spell at Peterborough, Maynard played for Brentwood Town and Chelmsford City.

References

1947 births
Living people
Association football defenders
Guyanese footballers
Guyanese expatriate footballers
Sportspeople from Georgetown, Guyana
Hounslow F.C. players
Crystal Palace F.C. players
Peterborough United F.C. players
Brentwood Town F.C. players
Chelmsford City F.C. players
English Football League players